The discography of Jason Castro.

Albums

Studio albums

EPs

Singles

Other releases

iTunes Exclusive "American Idol Live Performances"
 "Daydream"
 "I Just Want To Be Your Everything"
 "Hallelujah"

iTunes Exclusive "American Idol Studio Performances"1
 "If I Fell"
 "Michelle"
 "Fragile"
 "Travelin' Thru"
 "Over The Rainbow"
 "I Don't Wanna Cry"
 "Memory"
 "Forever In Blue Jeans"
 "Mr. Tambourine Man"

Demos and live recordings (pre-Idol songs)
 "The Other Side"
 "Someday" (with Jackie Castro)
 "A Song About Stars"
 "So Fast"
 "I'm Not Who I Was"
 "Crazy" (live)
 "Santeria" (live)
 "Clumsy" (live)

Soundtracks
 "Hallelujah", Amar a Morir soundtrack
 "Memory", Titanic  soundtrack

Releases with Michael and Jackie Castro
Jason Castro has released covers on iTunes with his two younger siblings, both of whom are also singer-songwriters. He has released covers of other popular songs with them and they have been released as singles; with his younger brother, Michael, he has released three and as a family trio named Castro (Jason, Michael and younger sister Jackie), they have released four covers as singles. The Castro siblings released their first music video for their original song "Rock and Roll" on YouTube on May 10, 2015.

Covers
"Best Song Ever" - Michael Castro (featuring Jason Castro)
"I'll Be Home for Christmas" (duet with Michael Castro)
"Hey Brother" (duet with Michael Castro)
"White Christmas" - Castro
"Still Into You" - Castro
"Roar" - Castro
"Chocolate" - Castro

Original songs
"Rock and Roll" (2015)

Notes

References 

Discographies of American artists
Pop music discographies
Christian music discographies